William Rowlands (30 July 1883 – 29 June 1948) was an English cricketer. He played for Gloucestershire between 1901 and 1928.

References

1883 births
1948 deaths
English cricketers
Gloucestershire cricketers
Cricketers from Bristol